

Group A

Australia
Head coach:  Terry Venables

Brazil
Head coach: Mário Zagallo

Mexico
Head coach: Manuel Lapuente

Saudi Arabia
Head coach:  Otto Pfister

Group B

Czech Republic
Head coach: Dušan Uhrin

South Africa
Head coach:  Clive Barker

United Arab Emirates
Head coach: Milan Máčala

Uruguay
Head coach: Víctor Púa

External links
FIFA.com

Squads
FIFA Confederations Cup squads